Sir Arthur Hugh McShine was the Chief Justice of Trinidad and Tobago from 1969 until 1970. He was earlier the acting Chief Judge of Trinidad and Tobago in 1961 till Trinidad and Tobago became independent in 1962.

References 

Chief justices of Trinidad and Tobago
Knights Bachelor
Possibly living people
Year of birth missing